General Anson may refer to:

Edward Anson (1826–1925), British Army major general
George Anson (British Army officer, born 1769) (1769–1849), British Army general
George Anson (British Army officer, born 1797) (1797–1857), British major general
Sir William Anson, 1st Baronet (1772–1847), British Army general